Edgar Franklin Foreman Jr. (December 22, 1933 – February 2, 2022) was an American businessman and politician who was a member of the United States House of Representatives. He had one term representing Texas's 16th congressional district from 1963 to 1965 and a second term from 1969 to 1971 representing New Mexico's 2nd district, then newly established. He is the most historically recent member of Congress to have represented more than one state during their career.

Early life and education
Foreman was born near Portales, New Mexico, in Roosevelt County in southeastern New Mexico, to Edgar Foreman Sr. and the former Lillian Childress.

From 1952 to 1953, he attended Eastern New Mexico College in Portales. He transferred to New Mexico State University in Las Cruces, where in 1955 he obtained a Bachelor of Science degree in civil engineering.

From 1953 to 1956, Foreman was employed by Phillips Petroleum Company. From 1956 to 1957, he served in the United States Navy as an enlisted sailor. He also served in the United States Navy Reserve and United States Air Force Reserve. While in the Air Force Reserve, he became a captain in the 9999th Air Reserve Squadron in Washington, DC while serving as a congressman. He headed Foreman Brine Sales and Service in Odessa, Texas, from 1956 to 1962. He was formerly the president of Valley Transit Mix, Atlas Land Company, and Foreman Oil, Inc.

Political career

Represented West Texas, 1963–1965
In 1962 Foreman was elected to Congress from the 16th District in West Texas, which stretched from El Paso to the Permian Basin. His victory is attributed to the incumbent Democratic Representative J. T. Rutherford having been linked with the Billie Sol Estes scandal. In that same election, the Democrat, later Republican, John B. Connally, Jr., was elected governor over the Republican oilfield equipment executive Jack Cox.

Foreman was defeated when he sought re-election in 1964, a year in which President Lyndon B. Johnson, a Texan, was reelected over Republican U.S. Senator Barry M. Goldwater in a landslide, and the Republicans suffered massive losses throughout the nation.

Represented southern New Mexico, 1969–1971
Following his defeat, he relocated to New Mexico, where he became active in business and civic affairs in Las Cruces. In 1968 while residing in Las Cruces, Foreman ran for Congress in the southern district of New Mexico and upset the two-term Democrat E. S. "Johnny" Walker of Albuquerque. Richard Nixon won New Mexico's electoral votes that year over Hubert H. Humphrey, and that Republican momentum helped Foreman to get elected. Foreman was unseated after a single term in 1970 by Democrat Harold Runnels.

Appointment to two federal jobs
After losing a House seat for the second time in six years, Foreman in 1971 was appointed Assistant Secretary of the Interior in the Nixon administration, and the following year, 1972, he was appointed to a position at the United States Department of Transportation, where he stayed until 1976.

Personal life and death
Foreman died on February 2, 2022, at the age of 88.

References
General

Specific
Congressional Quarterly's Guide to U.S. Elections, U.S. House edition

External links

 http://www.edforeman.com/

1933 births
2022 deaths
People from Portales, New Mexico
Republican Party members of the United States House of Representatives from New Mexico
Politicians from Dallas
People from Odessa, Texas
People from Las Cruces, New Mexico
Military personnel from New Mexico
United States Navy reservists
United States Navy sailors
United States Air Force officers
United States Air Force reservists
Eastern New Mexico University alumni
New Mexico State University alumni
Methodists from Texas
Republican Party members of the United States House of Representatives from Texas